On March 6, 2023, 28-year-old Irvo Otieno died after he was restrained by Henrico County sheriff's deputies and hospital employees at Central State Hospital in Dinwiddie County, Virginia, near Petersburg. He was arrested on March 3 for a suspected breaking and entering, and was taken to the hospital three days later after he was found naked in his cell. A total of ten people, seven deputies and three hospital employees, were charged with second-degree murder in connection with Otieno's death.

People involved 
Irvo Otieno; referred to as Ivor by his family, was a 28-year-old man originally from Kenya. He had begun dealing with mental health issues during his last year of high school and had previously gone to a mental health facility.

The seven Henrico County Sheriff's deputies were identified as Randy Boyer, Dwayne Bramble, Jermaine Branch, Bradley Disse, Tabitha Levere, Brandon Rodgers, and Kaiyell Sanders. The three hospital employees were identified as Darian Blackwell, Wavie Jones, and Sadarius Williams.

Arrest and death 
On March 3, police were called to a home in Henrico County for a reported breaking and entering, where a woman told police she believed her home was burglarized. Police arrested Otieno at the scene and placed him under an emergency custody order. He was taken to Parham Doctors' Hospital for an inspection, where he allegedly became combatative towards officers, before being transported to Henrico County Jail.

Three days later on March 6, deputies transported Otieno to Central State Hospital after he was found naked and covered in feces in his cell. During the intake process, Otieno "became combative during the admission process", according to Dinwiddie County Commonwealth's Attorney Ann Cabell Baskervill. Deputies and hospital employees restrained Otieno, who became unresponsive and died. Deputies and Otieno arrived just before 4 p.m., and Virginia State Police were called to investigate his death around 7:30 p.m. Cabell Baskervill stated that Otieno was held on the ground in handcuffs and leg irons for twelve minutes. She also said that Otieno's death was not reported for three and a half hours, and when it was reported Otieno's body was moved, his handcuffs removed and washed, and a call was made to a funeral home instead of the medical examiner's office.

Investigation and criminal charges 
On March 14, seven Henrico County deputies were charged with second-degree murder. Two days later, three hospital employees were also charged with murder. A preliminary autopsy found Otieno's cause of death to be asphyxiation by smothering.

The Dinwiddie Commonwealth's Attorney's Office plans to release surveillance video of Otieno's death.

Aftermath 
Otieno's family hired attorney Ben Crump.

References 

2023 controversies in the United States
2023 deaths
2023 in Virginia
Filmed deaths in the United States
Filmed killings by law enforcement
Killings by law enforcement officers in the United States
Law enforcement controversies in the United States
Law enforcement in Virginia
March 2023 events in the United States
Medical controversies in the United States